All Frames of the Game is the debut album by American rap group Playaz Tryna Strive, released November 12, 1996, on Sick Wid It and Jive Records. Playaz Tryna Strive, also known as P.T.S., is composed of Filthy Rich and T–Pup. The album was produced by Filthy Rich, K-Lou, Mike D, Studio Ton and Wayniac, and executive produced by B-Legit and E-40. The album peaked at number 100 on the Billboard Top R&B/Hip-Hop Albums. It features guest performances by E-40, B-Legit, Levitti, Silk–E, Suga-T and E-Clipze.

Along with a single, a music video was released for the song, "They Say Y.D.L.L." (Youngsta's Don't Live Long).

The song, "Feel Ness Real", was originally released on the 1995 Sick Wid It Records compilation, The Hogg in Me.

Track listing
 "Dime A Dozen" (featuring E-40) – 4:02
 "Feel Ness Real" (radio version) – 4:45
 "Throw up the Dubb" – 4:00
 "Big Pimpin'" (interlude) (featuring Kaveo) – 1:07
 "Alkahal & Dozanique"  (featuring Silk–E & Levitti) – 4:55
 "Haterism" (featuring B-Legit) – 4:53
 "W.C. Playaz" (featuring Silk–E & ANS) – 4:02
 "Money Hungry M.F." (interlude) – 0:30
 "They Say Y.D.L.L." – 4:53
 "9 Sexual" (interlude) (featuring Silk-E & Kaveo) – 1:08
 "Let's Ride" – 4:09
 "Land of Fonk" – 4:05
 "Feel Ness Real" (interlude) (featuring B-Legit & E-40) – 0:39
 "Hoe Shit" (featuring ANS) – 3:55
 "All Frames of the Game" – 4:20
 "Shady" (featuring Suga-T) – 4:03
 "E.S.P." (featuring Silk–E & E-Clipze) – 4:58
 "Feel Ness Real" (street version) – 3:50

Chart history

Personnel

 B-Legit – Vocals, Talking, Performer, Executive Producer
 Tom Coyne – Mastering
 Mike D – Keyboards, Background Vocals, Producer
 E-40 – Vocals, Performer, Executive Producer
 E-Clipze – Vocals
 Filthy Rich – Keyboards, Vocals, Producer, Drum Programming
 Indo – Engineer, Mixing
 K-Lou – Producer, Engineer, Mixing, Keyboards, Drum Programming, Guitar
 Kaveo – Vocals, Talking
 Keba Konte – Photography
 Levitti – Background Vocals

 Mike D – Producer, Keyboards, Drum Programming, Background Vocals
 Poppy – Background Vocals
 Phunky Phat Graph-X – Artwork Design
 P.T.S. – Performer
 Ruzell Simpson – Guitar
 Silk-E – Vocals, Background Vocals
 Studio Ton – Producer
 Suga-T – Vocals, Background Vocals, Performer
 Tom Coyne – Mastering
 T-Pup – Vocals, Background Vocals
 Wayniac – Keyboards, Producer, Drum Programming

References

External links
 [ All Frames of the Game] at Allmusic
 All Frames of the Game at Discogs
 All Frames of the Game at Tower Records

1996 debut albums
Albums produced by Studio Ton
Gangsta rap albums by American artists
Jive Records albums
Sick Wid It Records albums
West Coast hip hop albums